DWRA (92.7 FM), broadcasting as Barangay FM 92.7, is a radio station owned and operated by GMA Network Inc. The station's studio is located at the 2nd Floor, Baguio Midland Courier, #16 Kisad Rd., Baguio, and its transmitter is located at La Trinidad, Benguet.

Awards and recognition
In 2002 and 2003, the station was selected finalist in the KBP Golden Dove Awards for Best Provincial Radio Variety Show (Campus Centerfold) and Provincial Radio Variety Show Host (Bobby Boom). In 2010 and 2011, the station's program "Talk To Papa" was selected finalist for Best Radio Counseling Program in the Catholic Mass Media Awards. In 2011, the station's "Mga Kuwentong Karnero" (now called Pelikulang Panradyo) was selected finalist for Best Radio Drama program. Campus Radio DJ "Papa Boom" was also voted Best Male DJ in 2011 and 2012 by the UP Baguio Dap-ay Awards for Media.

Events
Radio GMA Baguio is known in the Northern Luzon events scene for its trademark band competition, "Bulaklak Rock" which started in 2004 until 2011. In 2012, they launched "Bulaklak Rock: Acoustic Session" at Panagbenga Festival's Session Road In Bloom. In 2013, they staged the first "Campus Radio Streetjump Session: Baguio's Ultimate Dance Battle" for the dance crews in Northern Luzon.

References

Barangay FM stations
Radio stations in Baguio
Radio stations established in 1996